Victoria National Golf Course (officially Victoria National Golf Club) is located northeast of Newburgh, Indiana, in the southwestern corner of the state, roughly 7 miles east of Evansville, Indiana. Victoria is a private 18-hole golf course that was designed by golf course architect Tom Fazio and constructed in 1996 on land that had been used for strip mines from the 1950s until 1977. Developed and initially owned by Terry Friedman and family, the course was sold to Victoria Partners LLC in 2010. As of 2018 it was purchased by the Dormie Network. 

As of August 2019, Victoria National is ranked as the 43rd best golf course in America, according to Golf Digest. Victoria is certified in Audubon International's Cooperative Sanctuary Program for Golf Courses.

Tournaments hosted
Victoria National hosted its first high profile tournament beginning in 2012; the  Korn Ferry Tour's United Leasing Championship was held for seven seasons (2012–18). The tournament purse was over a half-million dollars, and the event was televised by the Golf Channel.

Following the 2018 season, Victoria National signed a 10 year deal to become home of the  Korn Ferry Tour Championship. 

Previously, Victoria hosted Legends Tour (the official senior tour of the LPGA) tournaments in 2003 and 2004, as well as the U.S. Senior Amateur in 2006.

Course information
Victoria National has a clubhouse, pro shop, driving range, putting green, and restaurant. 

The 18-hole course has a Par of 72 with 6 sets of tees: 
Victorian, the back tees with a total length of 7239 yards
Tecumseh, the second-to-last tees with a total length of 6861 yards
Chinook, the third-to-last tees with a total length of 6598 yards
Ayrshire, the fourth-to-last tees with a total length of 6306 yards
Squaw Creek, the senior tees with a total length of 5697 yards
Darlington, the women's tees with a total length of 5032 yards

Holes
Number 1
Par 4 that plays 442 from Victorian, 413 from Tecumseh, 413 from Chinook, 376 from Ayrshire, 329 from Squaw Creek, and 329 from Darlington.

Number 2
Par 4 that plays 371 from Victorian, 356 from Tecumseh, 323 from Chinook, 323 from Ayrshire, 286 from Squaw Creek, and 197 from Darlington.

Number 3
Par 5 that plays 578 from Victorian, 539 from Tecumseh, 539 from Chinook, 508 from Ayrshire, 467 from Squaw Creek, and 427 from Darlington.

Number 4
Par 4 that plays 355 from Victorian, 355 from Tecumseh, 338 from Chinook, 311 from Ayrshire, 293 from Squaw Creek, and 266 from Darlington.

Number 5
Par 3 that plays 212 from Victorian, 187 from Tecumseh, 183 from Chinook, 170 from Ayrshire, 146 from Squaw Creek, and 109 from Darlington.

Number 6
Par 4 that plays 474 from Victorian, 432 from Tecumseh, 427 from Chinook, 408 from Ayrshire, 316 from Squaw Creek, and 272 from Darlington.

Number 7
Par 3 that plays 183 from Victorian, 166 from Tecumseh, 152 from Chinook, 142 from Ayrshire, 134 from Squaw Creek, and 124 from Darlington.

Number 8
Par 4 that plays 425 from Victorian, 407 from Tecumseh, 391 from Chinook, 391 from Ayrshire, 356 from Squaw Creek, and 311 from Darlington.

Number 9
Par 5 that plays 558 from Victorian, 542 from Tecumseh, 508 from Chinook, 472 from Ayrshire, 438 from Squaw Creek, and 403 from Darlington.

Number 10
Par 5 that plays 543 from Victorian, 526 from Tecumseh, 526 from Chinook, 506 from Ayrshire, 481 from Squaw Creek, and 444 from Darlington.

Number 11
Par 3 that plays 233 from Victorian, 196 from Tecumseh, 176 from Chinook, 158 from Ayrshire, 158 from Squaw Creek, and 119 from Darlington.

Number 12
Par 4 that plays 357 from Victorian, 343 from Tecumseh, 317 from Chinook, 317 from Ayrshire, 293 from Squaw Creek, and 293 from Darlington.

Number 13
Par 4 that plays 395 from Victorian, 393 from Tecumseh, 345 from Chinook, 342 from Ayrshire, 295 from Squaw Creek, and 278 from Darlington.

Number 14
Par 4 that plays 471 from Victorian, 443 from Tecumseh, 443 from Chinook, 406 from Ayrshire, 388 from Squaw Creek, and 347 from Darlington.

Number 15
Par 5 that plays 548 from Victorian, 535 from Tecumseh, 530 from Chinook, 530 from Ayrshire, 463 from Squaw Creek, and 418 from Darlington.

Number 16
Par 3 that plays 208 from Victorian, 194 from Tecumseh, 168 from Chinook, 161 from Ayrshire, 139 from Squaw Creek, and 95 from Darlington.

Number 17
Par 4 that plays 454 from Victorian, 428 from Tecumseh, 414 from Chinook, 395 from Ayrshire, 377 from Squaw Creek, and 309 from Darlington.

Number 18
Par 4 that plays 432 from Victorian, 406 from Tecumseh, 405 from Chinook, 390 from Ayrshire, 338 from Squaw Creek, and 290 from Darlington.

References

External links
 Official site

Golf clubs and courses in Indiana
Buildings and structures in Warrick County, Indiana